Cab Calloway's Jitterbug Party is a 1935 American musical short film which was released by Paramount Pictures (later sold to U.M. & M. TV Corporation). In 2001, the film was reissued by Kino International in the DVD collection Hollywood Rhythm: Vol. 1-The Best Of Jazz And Blues.

Synopsis 
Bandleader Cab Calloway and his Orchestra perform "Hotcha Razz-Ma-Tazz" and "Long About Midnight" at the Cotton Club in Harlem, New York before going to a house party and performing "Jitterbug". In the final sequence, a young Lena Horne can be seen as a Cotton Club dancer doing the jitterbug.

References

External links 

1935 films
American black-and-white films
1935 musical films
American musical films
Paramount Pictures short films
Television series by U.M. & M. TV Corporation
Jazz films
African-American musical films
1930s English-language films
1930s American films